Pefka or Retziki is a suburb and a former municipality in the Thessaloniki regional unit, Greece. Since the 2011 local government reform it is part of the municipality Neapoli-Sykies, of which it is a municipal unit. Population 13,052 (2011). It has a land area of 1.800 km².

References

Populated places in Thessaloniki (regional unit)